Cabot Links is a golf course located in Inverness, Nova Scotia, Canada. It is a full 18-hole true links course, but a 10-hole version of the course was opened in 2011. It was designed by Alberta native, Rod Whitman and is located on a former coal mine along the coast of the Gulf of Saint Lawrence.

Construction and development began in the late 2000s (although the town had been trying to get a golf course well before then). The golf course was the creation of Ben Cowan-Dewar, a Toronto-born 33-year-old, with the financial backing from Mike Keiser. Mike Keiser was the creator of Bandon Dunes.

The golf course has assisted with the rebirth of the Inverness economy, which went into decline after its coal mines closed. Its success led to the opening of a second golf course in July 2015, called Cabot Cliffs. Designed by world-renowned architect Bill Coore and two-time Masters Winner Ben Crenshaw, Cabot Cliffs quickly captured the media's attention and is considered by many to be in the running as one of the top courses in the world. The grand opening of the course was in June 2016. Adam Calver was the grow in superintendent of Cabot Cliffs.  Mr. Calver moved to Vietnam and works for Faldo Design in 2023.

The Cabot golf resort hosts three onsite restaurants, a 60-room hotel, a pro shop, and a gift shop. Cabot's real-estate program was launched in July 2015, consisting of nineteen Golf Villas and a discovery center. Villas are available for purchase and rent.

Links Golf: While golf in the twenty-first century is played on more than 30,000 courses worldwide, only 246 of them may be classified as links. What differentiates this 1% from the rest is their location and the type of terrain on which they are built. In Scotland, where golf is believed to have originated in the 15th century, the first courses were developed on stretches of land known as links. Farmers deemed these coastal lands useless because of the sandy soil, so golf course designers began to make use of them. Located between the land and the sea and with little to no trees, Links golf is subject to strong coastal wind which is why it is best played closer to the ground. The firm soil and short grass make bump-and-run shots and putting from close off the green popular choices. Both Cabot Links and Cabot Cliffs are True Links courses as they are located on the rugged coastline of Cape Breton Nova Scotia, where sandy soil, firm fairways, and coastal views embrace golf's early Scottish roots.

Quick facts

Scorecards

See also
List of golf courses in Nova Scotia

References

External links
 http://cabotlinks.com/

Golf clubs and courses in Nova Scotia